The 2007 Mr. Olympia contest was an IFBB professional bodybuilding competition and the feature event of Joe Weider's Olympia Weekend 2007 held September 28–29, 2007 at the Orleans Arena in Las Vegas, Nevada.

Results

Notable events

Jay Cutler wins his second consecutive Mr. Olympia title
Víctor Martínez had an impressive showing, narrowly placing 2nd
After the competition, Ronnie Coleman announced his retirement from professional bodybuilding

See also
 2007 Ms. Olympia
 Ronnie Coleman retirement speech (video)

References

External links 
 Mr. Olympia

 2008
Mr. Olympia
Mr. Olympia 2007
2007 in bodybuilding
Mr. Olympia 2007